The Basingstoke and District Saturday Football League is a football competition based in England. It has three divisions, of which the highest, the First Division, is a feeder league to the Hampshire Premier League and sits at level 13 of the English football league system.

Member clubs 2020–21
Division One
AFC Berg
CK Andover
Hook
Overton United Reserves
Renegades
TwentyTen
Division Two
AFC Aldermaston 'A'
Basingstoke Athletic
Brighton Hill Buffalos
North Warnborough
Oakridge
Overton United 'A'
Division Three
AFC Aldermaston Development
AFC Berg Reserves
Chineham
CK Andover Reserves
Odiham United
Tidworth Town

External links
Basingstoke and District League section of the Basingstoke Gazette website
FA Full-Time

 
Football leagues in England
Football in Hampshire
Sport in Basingstoke